Yelü Zhimo (? — 983), also known by his title the King of Ning (宁王), was an imperial prince of the Liao dynasty. He was granted as the King of Ning during the reign of Emperor Muzong of Liao. He was the third son of Emperor Shizong by  Empress Zhen. His mother was the only Han Empress Consort in Liao's history.  He was half younger brother of Emperor Jingzong. Zhimo has an affair with one of Yelü Jing's maid and after it was discovered by Jing own, he lost one of his eye to protect his lover and then become half blind, also sentenced to imperial punishment and became an eunuch. After his wife death, he started live alone in his Mansion and became a Buddhist monk.

In popular culture
Portrayed by Simon Lian  in the 2020 Chinese TV series The Legend of Xiao Chuo.

References

983 deaths
Liao dynasty people
10th-century Khitan people
Yelü clan
Liao dynasty politicians